The 2003 Aragonese regional election was held on Sunday, 25 May 2003, to elect the 6th Cortes of the autonomous community of Aragon. All 67 seats in the Cortes were up for election. The election was held simultaneously with regional elections in 12 other autonomous communities and local elections all throughout Spain.

The election saw the Spanish Socialist Workers' Party (PSOE), which had ruled Aragon since the previous election, becoming the largest party in the Courts for the first time since the 1991 election. The PSOE gains came at the expense of the People's Party (PP), which saw a drop of 7 points on its vote share. The Aragonese Union (CHA) made gains and overtook the Aragonese Party (PAR) as the third largest party in the Courts. For the PAR, this was the fourth consecutive election where it lost ground. United Left (IU) held its single seat, albeit with a slightly reduced vote share.

The PSOE and PAR maintained the coalition administration formed after the previous election. As a result, Marcelino Iglesias was re-elected as President of Aragon.

Overview

Electoral system
The Cortes of Aragon were the devolved, unicameral legislature of the autonomous community of Aragon, having legislative power in regional matters as defined by the Spanish Constitution and the Aragonese Statute of Autonomy, as well as the ability to vote confidence in or withdraw it from a regional president.

Voting for the Cortes was on the basis of universal suffrage, which comprised all nationals over 18 years of age, registered in Aragon and in full enjoyment of their political rights. The 67 members of the Cortes of Aragon were elected using the D'Hondt method and a closed list proportional representation, with an electoral threshold of three percent of valid votes—which included blank ballots—being applied in each constituency. Seats were allocated to constituencies, corresponding to the provinces of Huesca, Teruel and Zaragoza, with each being allocated an initial minimum of 13 seats and the remaining 28 being distributed in proportion to their populations (provided that the seat-to-population ratio in the most populated province did not exceed 2.75 times that of the least populated one).

The use of the D'Hondt method might result in a higher effective threshold, depending on the district magnitude.

Election date
The term of the Cortes of Aragon expired four years after the date of their previous election. Elections to the Cortes were fixed for the fourth Sunday of May every four years. The previous election was held on 13 June 1999, setting the election date for the Cortes on Sunday, 25 May 2003.

The president had the prerogative to dissolve the Cortes of Aragon and call a snap election, provided that no motion of no confidence was in process, no nationwide election was due and some time requirements were met: namely, that dissolution did not occur either during the first legislative session or within the legislature's last year ahead of its scheduled expiry, nor before one year had elapsed since a previous dissolution under this procedure. In the event of an investiture process failing to elect a regional president within a two-month period from the first ballot, the Cortes were to be automatically dissolved and a fresh election called. Any snap election held as a result of these circumstances would not alter the period to the next ordinary election, with elected deputies merely serving out what remained of their four-year terms.

Parties and candidates
The electoral law allowed for parties and federations registered in the interior ministry, coalitions and groupings of electors to present lists of candidates. Parties and federations intending to form a coalition ahead of an election were required to inform the relevant Electoral Commission within ten days of the election call, whereas groupings of electors needed to secure the signature of at least one percent of the electorate in the constituencies for which they sought election, disallowing electors from signing for more than one list of candidates.

Below is a list of the main parties and electoral alliances which contested the election:

Opinion polls
The table below lists voting intention estimates in reverse chronological order, showing the most recent first and using the dates when the survey fieldwork was done, as opposed to the date of publication. Where the fieldwork dates are unknown, the date of publication is given instead. The highest percentage figure in each polling survey is displayed with its background shaded in the leading party's colour. If a tie ensues, this is applied to the figures with the highest percentages. The "Lead" column on the right shows the percentage-point difference between the parties with the highest percentages in a poll. When available, seat projections determined by the polling organisations are displayed below (or in place of) the percentages in a smaller font; 34 seats were required for an absolute majority in the Cortes of Aragon.

Results

Overall

Distribution by constituency

Aftermath

References
Opinion poll sources

Other

2003 in Aragon
Aragon
Regional elections in Aragon
May 2003 events in Europe